The 1833 Maine gubernatorial election took place on September 9, 1833. Incumbent Democratic Governor Samuel E. Smith was defeated for re-nomination by Robert P. Dunlap. Smith ran for re-election as an Independent Democrat.

Dunlap defeated National Republican candidate Daniel Goodenow and Smith with 52.14% of the vote.

Democratic nomination
The Democratic state convention was held on June 26, 1833, at Augusta, Maine.

Results

References

Gubernatorial
1833
Maine
September 1833 events